A human shield is a non-combatant (or a group of non-combatants) who either volunteers or is forced to shield a legitimate military target in order to deter the enemy from attacking it. 

The concept of human shields as a resistance measure was created by Mahatma Gandhi as a weapon of resistance. On the other hand, the weaponization of civilians has also developed as a tactic by some non-state actors like ISIS.

Legal background 

Forcing non-combatants to serve as human shields is a war crime according to the 1949 Geneva Conventions, the 1977 Additional Protocol I to the Geneva Conventions, and the 1998 Rome Statute.

According to law professor Eliav Lieblich, "Armed groups might be responsible for harm that they occasion to civilians under their control. But to argue that this absolves the other party from responsibility is to get both law and morality wrong."

Law professor Adil Ahmad Haque states that involuntary shields "retain their legal and moral protection from intentional, unnecessary, and disproportionate harm." He argues against the position of the United States Department of Defense (as well as the United Kingdom and some scholars) that attackers may discount or disregard collateral harm in determining proportionality and states that these views are "legally baseless and morally unsound".

Authors Neve Gordon and Nicola Perugini, elaborating on their book, Human Shields: A History of People in the Line of Fire, discuss "proximate shields", humans as shields merely due to proximity to belligerents and assert that this type has become "by far the most prominent type of shield in contemporary discourse". They say that the proximate shielding accusation has been used by States to cover-up war crimes against civilian populations and that human rights organizations frequently fail to question this charge which they claim is being improperly used to justify civilian deaths.

20th century 

Indian revolutionary Mahatma Gandhi had created the concept of human shield as a tool of resistance.

World War I
Article 23 of the 1907 Hague Convention states that "A belligerent is forbidden to compel the nationals of the hostile party to take part in the operations of war directed against their own country". The 1915 report says "If it be not permissible to compel a man to fire on his fellow citizens, neither can he be forced to protect the enemy and to serve as a living screen".

Palestine

In the British mandate of Palestine, Arab civilians and insurgents who were captured by the British as prisoners of war during the Great Palestinian Revolt were frequently taken and placed on "pony trucks", "on which hostages could be made to sit"; these were placed at the front of trains to deter other insurgents from detonating explosives on the railways. A soldier with the Manchester Regiment described the technique:
They would "go down to Acre jail and borrow say five rebels, three rebels, and you'd sit them on the bonnet, so the guy up in the hill could see an Arab on the truck so he wouldn't blow it… If [the rebel] was unlucky the truck coming up behind would hit him. But nobody bothered to pick the bits up. They were left."

The practice began on 24 September 1936 when Brigadier J. F. Evetts reacted to Palestinian rebel attacks against British positions in Nablus by forcing the city mayor, Suleiman Abdul Razzaq Tuqan, to sit exposed on the roof of a garrison building under fire, as a 'high-value human shield'. Tuqan returned his Order of the British Empire commendation in protest.

World War II
On August 14, 1937, in what would become the first major battle of World War II in Asia between China and the occupying forces of the Empire of Japan at the Battle of Shanghai, the Imperial Japanese Navy berthed their flagship Izumo in front of the Shanghai International Settlement; it is believed in what would become known as "Black Saturday", Chinese Air Force Gamma 2E bomber pilots targeted the Japanese warship, but had to release the bombs at a much lower altitude than they usually trained for due to low cloud ceiling, and did not properly reset their bomb sights, which resulted in two of the 1,100 lb bombs falling short and landing on the adjacent International Settlement (one failing to explode) and killing at least 950 Chinese civilians, foreigners and refugees.

After World War II, it was claimed by SS general Gottlob Berger that there was a plan, proposed by the Luftwaffe and approved by Adolf Hitler, to set up special POW camps for captured airmen of the Royal Air Force and the United States Army Air Forces in large German cities, to act as human shields against their bombing raids. Berger realized that this would contravene the 1929 Geneva Convention and argued that there was not enough barbed wire—as a result, this plan was not implemented.

Wehrmacht and later SS forces extensively used Polish civilians as human shields during Warsaw Uprising when attacking the insurgents' positions. In the Wola massacre in Poland on August 7, 1944, the Nazis forced civilian women onto the armored vehicles as human shields to enhance their effectiveness.

In Belgium in May 1940, at least 86 civilians were killed by the German Wehrmacht in an event known as the Vinkt Massacre, when the Germans took 140 civilians and used them as shields to cross a bridge while under fire by Belgian forces. As the battle progressed, German soldiers began executing hostages.

During the Battle of Okinawa and the Battle of Manila, Japanese soldiers often used civilians as human shields against American troops.

When the Japanese were concerned about the incoming Allied air raids on their home islands as they were losing their controlled Pacific islands one by one to the Allies in the Pacific War, they scattered major military installations and factories throughout urban areas. Historians argued that this meant Japan was using its civilians as human shields to protect their legitimate military targets against Allied bombardment. As a result, the U.S. Army Air Forces (USAAF) was unable to strike purely military targets due to the limitations of their bombsight, the mixing of military installations and factories with urban areas, and the widespread cottage industry in Japan's cities. This led the USAAF in early 1945 to switch from precision bombing to carpet bombing, which destroyed 67 Japanese cities with incendiary bombs, and ultimately led to the use of atomic bombs on the Japanese cities of Hiroshima and Nagasaki.

Algerian War

In 1960s Algeria, during the Algerian War, France used civilians as hostages and human shields in its fight against the National Liberation Army.

Iraqi–Kurdish conflict

In 1963, a Ba'athist tank unit in Kirkuk covered its assault on a Kurdish suburb with a human shield of Kurdish women and children.

Korean War
In the Battle of the Notch, North Korean forces were claimed to have used captured U.S. soldiers as human shields while advancing.

Lebanese Civil War

In August 1976, at the Siege of Tel al-Zaatar, Christian Lebanese militias alleged that the Palestinians at Tel al-Zaatar were using Lebanese families inside the camp as human shields.

1982 Lebanon War
During the 1982 Lebanon War, the Palestinian refugee camp of Ain al-Hilweh was surrounded by Israeli forces as the last stronghold of Palestinian militants in southern Lebanon, but "Soldiers of Allah" militants commanded by the Muslim fundamentalist Haj Ibrahim refused to surrender: Their motto was "Victory or death!" Over a two-day period, Israeli forces under the leadership of Brigadier General Yitzhak Mordechai repeatedly announced "Whoever does not bear arms will not be harmed" and urged civilians in the camp to evacuate, but few did. Three delegations of prominent Sidon figures were sent to persuade Haj Ibrahim's fighters that "their cause was hopeless, and whoever was willing to lay down his arms would be allowed to leave the camp unharmed." None of the delegations were successful; the first was prevented from approaching the fighters by "a spray of bullets", while the third "returned with the most harrowing tale of all": "Militiamen were shooting civilians who tried to escape. In one particularly grisly incident, three children were shot because their father had suggested calling an end to the fighting." After a delegation of Palestinian POWs—"headed by a PLO officer who was prepared to give the defenders his professional assessment of Ein Hilweh's grave military situation"—and an offer by Mordechai to "meet personally with" Haj Ibrahim were also rebuffed, "a team of psychologists ... was flown to Sidon to advise the command on how to deal with such irrational behavior." However, "the best advice the psychologists could offer was to organize yet another but considerably larger delegation comprising some forty or so people and including women and children"; Haj Ibrahim responded to the fifth delegation with "exactly the same three words"—triggering a bloody battle in which Israeli troops finally took the camp.

According to 1982 Newsweek photo, Israeli soldiers were attacked by PLO fighters disguised as hospital patients.

Bangladesh
During the Chittagong Hill Tracts conflict in the 1970s, an account tells that throughout the conflict, the military burned the homes of the Jummas, carried out mass killings and rape of Jumma women, and placed Bengali settlers as human shields on the land of the Jummas near the military camps.

Iraq under Saddam Hussein

Saddam Hussein systematically used human shields in Iraq. According to a CIA report, he used the tactics at least since 1988.

Gulf War
One of the most famous uses of human shields occurred in Iraq in 1990, following the Iraqi invasion of Kuwait that precipitated the Gulf War of 1990–1991. Saddam Hussein's government detained hundreds of citizens of Western countries who were in Iraq for use as human shields in an attempt to deter nations from participating in military operations against the country. A number of these hostages were filmed meeting Hussein, and kept with him to deter any targeted attacks, whilst others were held in or near military and industrial targets. He used both Westerners and Iraqi civilians.

In 1991, during the operations in the Gulf War, the U.S. submitted a report to the UN Security Council denouncing Iraq for having "intentionally placed civilians at risk through its behavior". The report cited the following examples of such behavior:

The Iraqi government moved significant amounts of military weapons and equipment into civilian areas with the deliberate purpose of using innocent civilians and their homes as shields against attacks on legitimate military targets.
Iraqi fighter and bomber aircraft were dispersed into villages near the military airfields where they were parked between civilian houses and even placed immediately adjacent to important archaeological sites and historic treasures.
Coalition aircraft were fired upon by anti-aircraft weapons in residential neighborhoods in various cities. In Baghdad, anti-aircraft sites were located on hotel roofs.
In one case, military engineering equipment used to traverse rivers, including mobile bridge sections, was located in several villages near an important crossing point. The Iraqis parked each vehicle adjacent to a civilian house.

Al-Qaeda
In the aftermath of the 1998 United States embassy bombings, Osama bin Laden stressed that he would have committed the attacks even if his own children were being used as human shields.

Bosnian War
Shortly after the cease-fire between Croat and Serb forces, the Army of Republika Srpska launched an assault against the safe area of Goražde, heavily shelling the town and surrounding villages. Protests and exhortations from the UN Security Council were ineffective, and on April 10 and 11, 1994, NATO launched air strikes against Bosnian Serb positions. In retaliation, Bosnian Serb forces captured UN personnel within their areas of operation and used them as human shields at sites expected to be bombed. In a similar situation to what had happened in Sarajevo, an ultimatum was issued, and by the 24th, most of the Serb troops had complied.

21st century

War in Afghanistan
According to various accounts, including that of the American ambassador to the U.N., the Taliban used women and children from their own population as human shields against coalition forces in 2006, 2007, and 2008, during the war in Afghanistan.

Lord's Resistance Army

According to Human Rights Watch 2004 report, the Lord's Resistance Army used children as human shields, porters, and laborers.

Abu Sayyaf

In 2018, several Abu Sayyaf militants were arrested in the Philippines, among them being a "key man" of the group. The arrests occurred after clashes in Sabah and Putrajaya, where Abu Sayyaf allegedly used children as human shields against the Philippine army.

Iran

Flight 752

In the aftermath of Iran's shoot down of Ukraine International Airlines Flight 752 in January 2020, Iran and the Islamic Revolutionary Guard Corps were accused of using civilian aircraft and their passengers and crew as human shields.

According to The New York Times:

They also hoped that the presence of passenger jets could act as a deterrent against an American attack on the airport or the nearby military base, effectively turning planeloads of unsuspecting travelers into human shields.

Canada's Minister of Transport Marc Garneau also questioned why Iran let civilian aircraft in its airspace, and suggested Iran intended to use the civilian aircraft as human shields.

Boko Haram

In 2015, the Islamist group Boko Haram has abducted some 500 women and children to serve as human shields.

In 2016 it was reported the group kidnapped schoolgirls "used as human shield[s]".

Houthis in Yemen

Houthis have been known to use human shields in their war in Yemen at least since 2016, as from a UN report at the time.

In 2018, the Houthis were accused by the Yemenite government of use of human shields Amnesty International warned that the Houthis are "militarising" hospitals.

In September 2019, UAE media reported that Houthi rebels blocked food from reaching civilians used as human shields.

Myanmar
As a continuing use of human shields, in 2014, a report says that Myanmar's army still abducts civilians and forces them to act as guides and human shields.

Venezuela

In August 2017, Venezuelan president Nicolas Maduro has been accused of turning to civilians for "human shields" against the US. Freddy Guevara, an opposition deputy, branded cowardly the actions of adding civilian personnel and the reserve to carry out military exercises and face a possible US attack.

In April 2020 it was reported that Nicolas Maduro had imprisoned hundreds of opposition members to use as human shields in a potential US invasion.

Israeli–Palestinian conflict
Both Israeli and Palestinian militant groups have been consistently accused of using human shields for military purposes. The charge has been leveled against Palestinian groups frequently by numerous observers. Israel has used the charge, in what has been termed its 'infowar' on social media, to explain the high ratio of civilian vs military casualties in its conflict with Gaza. In Operation Cast Lead 100 Gazans died for every Israeli, and the civilian ratio was 400 Gazans to 1 Israeli. Israeli spokesmen explained the difference by alleging that Hamas used civilians as shields. It has been argued that no evidence has come to light proving these claims. In September 2004, Justice Aharon Barak presiding over the Israeli Supreme Court, issued a demand that the IDF desist from the practice of using Palestinians as human shields, and in October outlawed the procedure. The independent human rights NGOs B'tselem and Amnesty International have stated that ample evidence exists in conflicts after that date that Israel has employed Palestinians as human shields. According to B'tselem, the practice goes back to 1967.

Palestine

As early as 2004 Amos Harel in Haaretz wrote that during the Second Intifada (2000–2005) Palestinian gunmen routinely used civilians and children as human shields and added that there is photographic evidence.

On November 22, 2006, Human Rights Watch (HRW) accused Muhammad Wail Baroud, a military commander in the Popular Resistance Committee, of using civilians for shielding homes against military attacks but later stated that they erred. There was no evidence that the house was being used for military purposes at the time of the planned attack, nor did the IDF explain what military objective it could have had. They considered the destruction in light of Israel's longstanding policy of destroying homes as punitive measures instead of as legitimate military targets. HRW acknowledged they did not consider the motives of the civilians, such as whether they willingly assembled or not, and emphasized that it did not want to criticize non-violent resistance or any other form of peaceful protest, including civilians defending their homes.

During the 2008–2009 Gaza War 
The Israeli Ministry of Foreign Affairs stated Hamas now regularly uses human shields to protect the homes of Hamas officials. The Israeli Intelligence and Terrorism Information Center accused Hamas and other armed groups of making extensive use of human shields as integral part of their war doctrine, in order to prevent the IDF from targeting them, during the Gaza War (2008–2009). The IDF released footage showing Palestinian fighters using ambulances for military purposes. Magen David Adom, the Israeli ambulance and medical emergency service, submitted to the UN a report concluding the accusation was unfounded.

The United Nations Fact-Finding Mission on the Gaza Conflict ("UNFFMG") that took place in 2008–2009 accepted the possibility that Hamas launched mortar attacks from the vicinity of a school and from residential homes, sometimes by the threat of force against residents. The report was unable to find specific evidence that civilians whose homes were used for rocket launches were "forced to remain in their houses" but the report repeatedly noted that Gaza residents were "reluctant" to discuss the conduct of Palestinian armed forces due to fear of reprisals.

In a post-invasion analysis of the conflict, Amnesty International stated that "Hamas and other Palestinian armed groups also violated international humanitarian law in their conduct within Gaza. They launched rockets and located military equipment and positions near civilian homes, endangering the lives of the inhabitants by exposing them to the risk of Israeli attacks. They also used empty homes and properties as combat positions during armed confrontations with Israeli forces, exposing the inhabitants of nearby houses to the danger of attacks or of being caught in the crossfire."

Amnesty further stated "However, contrary to repeated allegations by Israeli officials of the use of “human shields”, Amnesty International found no evidence that Hamas or other Palestinian fighters directed the movement of civilians to shield military objectives from attacks. It found no evidence that Hamas or other armed groups forced residents to stay in or around buildings used by fighters, nor that fighters prevented residents from leaving buildings or areas which had been commandeered by militants."

A review article in Case Western Reserve Journal of International Law stated that Israel warned residents to leave by using warnings such as roof knocking and phone calls, and that "Israel asserted that Palestinian civilians who did not abide by the warnings were acting as 'voluntary human shields', and were thus taking part in hostilities and could be targeted as combatants." The article determined this assertion to be unsupportable in international law.

During the 2009–2014 Gaza War 

Numerous reports during the war stated that Hamas used human shields. The UN High Commissioner for Human Rights Navi Pillay accused Hamas militants of violating international humanitarian law by "locating rockets within schools and hospitals, or even launching these rockets from densely populated areas". The European Union condemned Hamas, and in particular condemned "calls on the civilian population of Gaza to provide themselves as human shields". In a September 2014 interview, a Hamas official acknowledged to Associated Press that the group fired at Israel from civilian areas. He ascribed the practice to "mistakes", but said the group had little option due to the crowded landscape of the Strip, with its dearth of open zones. He denied accusations that rockets were launched "from schools or hospitals when in fact they were fired 200 or 300 meters (yards) away". In a 2014 interview, a Hamas political leader Khaled Meshaal said to a CNN interviewer that the group did not use its people as human shields.

In interviews with Gazan refugees, reporters for The Independent and The Guardian concluded it was a "myth" that Hamas forced civilians to stay in areas under attack against their will; many refugees told them they refused to heed the IDF's warnings because even areas Israel had declared safe for refugees had been shelled by its forces. The BBC Middle East editor Jeremy Bowen also said he "saw no evidence of Hamas using Palestinians as human shields". An Amnesty International document (dated July 25, 2014) asserts that they do "not have evidence at this point that Palestinian civilians have been intentionally used by Hamas or Palestinian armed groups during the current hostilities to 'shield' specific locations or military personnel or equipment from Israeli attacks". Amnesty International's assessment was that international humanitarian law was clear in that "even if officials or fighters from Hamas or Palestinian armed groups associated with other factions did in fact direct civilians to remain in a specific location in order to shield military objectives from attacks, all of Israel's obligations to protect these civilians would still apply". The human rights group, however, still found that Palestinian factions, as in previous conflicts, launched attacks from civilian areas.

Hamas Arabic-speaking spokesman Sami Abu Zuhri called up Gaza civilians on Hamas's Al-Aqsa TV July 8, 2014 to stay put in areas under fire by Israel, prompting accusations from Israel and others – the European Union, for example – that Hamas was calling on people to volunteer as "in effect human shields". For Amnesty International, however, Hamas' call may have been "motivated by a desire to avoid further panic" among civilians, considering both the lack of shelters in Gaza and the fact that some civilians who heeded the IDF's warnings had been casualties of Israeli attacks.

During the war, Israel also damaged hospitals, alleging they were concealing "hidden missiles". A team of Finnish journalists from Helsingin Sanomat working at the Gaza Al-Shifa hospital reported seeing rockets fired from near the Al-Shifa hospital. However, two Norwegian doctors who have been working at the hospital for decades have denied there was militant presence nearby, saying the last armed man they saw by the building was an Israeli doctor at the time of the First Intifada. The Washington Post described Al-Shifa hospital as a "de facto headquarters for Hamas leaders, who can be seen in the hallways and offices". Nick Casey of The Wall Street Journal tweeted a photo of a Hamas official using Al-Shifa hospital for media interviews, but later deleted the tweet. French-Palestinian journalist Radjaa Abu Dagg reported being interrogated by an armed Hamas member inside Al-Shifa hospital and ordered to leave Gaza.

The same organization asserted that "there was ample evidence to indicate that, in defiance of IDF rules, Israeli soldiers had used Palestinian civilians and children as shields to protect themselves" by sending Palestinians into homes where other militants were located and to encourage their surrender.

In 2015, The Washington Post said that an Amnesty International report condemned Palestinian militias for storing munitions in, and launching rockets from civilian structures and reported that the launching of attacks and storing of rockets "very near locations where hundreds of displaced civilians were taking shelter." The report stated "the available evidence indicates that Palestinian armed groups fired rockets and mortars from residential areas during the July/August 2014 conflict, and that on at least some occasions, projectiles were launched in close proximity to civilian buildings…significant areas within the 365km2 of territory are not residential, and conducting hostilities or launching munitions from these areas presents a lower risk of endangering Palestinian civilians…Palestinian armed groups stored rockets and other munitions in civilian buildings and facilities, including UN schools, during the conflict… storing munitions in civilian buildings or launching attacks from the vicinity of civilian buildings, violate the obligation to take all feasible precautions to protect civilians from the effects of attacks. But they do not necessarily amount to the specific violation of using "human shields" under international humanitarian law, which entails “using the presence (or movements) of civilians or other protected persons to render certain points or areas (or military forces) immune from military operations.” According to Philip Luther, Director of the Middle East and North Africa Programme at Amnesty International, "evidence suggesting that a rocket launched by a Palestinian armed group may have caused 13 civilian deaths inside Gaza underscores how indiscriminate these weapons can be and the dreadful consequences of using them". He also stated that "the devastating impact of Israeli attacks on Palestinian civilians during the conflict is undeniable, but violations by one side in a conflict can never justify violations by their opponents."

In 2019, a paper by the NATO Strategic Communications Centre of Excellence said that Hamas "has been using human shields in conflicts with Israel since 2007" and that several Israeli officers were court-martialled for doing it.

Israel 

According to many observers, including B'tselem, the IDF repeatedly used Palestinians as human shields. This practice became military policy during the Second Intifada, and was only dropped when Adalah challenged the practice before Israel's High Court of Justice in 2002. though the IDF persisted in using Palestinians in its 'neighbor procedure', whereby people picked at random were made to approach the houses of suspects and persuade them to surrender, a practice which arguably placed the former's lives in danger. The court ruled in October 2005 "that any use of Palestinian civilians during military actions is forbidden, including the 'prior warning procedure'." According to B'tselem, reports indicate that the practice has continued nonetheless, in military operations like Operation Cast Lead, and Operation Protective Edge, and the "vast majority of these reports were never investigated, and those that did result in no further action". Neve Gordon and Nicola Perugini, in their study of the phenomenon, note that Israeli citizens in densely populated areas like Tel Aviv are never spoken of as human shields when Hamas fires rockets towards the Israeli Defense command located in the centre of that city, whereas Palestinians in Gaza are depicted as human shields when Israel fires rockets at, or bombs, equally densely populated cities like Gaza.

During the Second Intifada

According to Israeli defense officials, the Israel Defense Forces made use of the "human shield" procedure on 1,200 occasions during the Second Intifada (2000–2005), and only on one occasion did a Palestinian civilian get hurt.

According to human rights groups Amnesty International and Human Rights Watch, the Israel Defense Forces (IDF) used Palestinian civilians as human shields during the 2002 Battle of Jenin. The Israeli human rights group B'Tselem said that "for a long period of time following the outbreak of the Second Intifada, particularly during Operation Defensive Shield, in April 2002, the IDF systematically used Palestinian civilians as human shields, forcing them to carry out military actions which threatened their lives". Al Mezan reported the systematic use of human shields during the invasion of Beit Hanoun in 2004. Human shields were also employed by Israeli soldiers to subdue a stone-throwing protest in Hebron in 2003.

In 2002 the Supreme Court of Israel issued a temporary injunction banning the practice in the wake of the death of 19-year-old Nidal Abu Mohsen, who was shot dead when he was forced by the IDF to knock on the door of his neighbor, Hamas militant Nasser Jarrar, in the West Bank village of Tubas and inform him of the Israeli army's demands that he surrender.

In 2004, a 13-year-old boy, Muhammed Badwan, was photographed tied to an Israeli police vehicle in the West Bank village of Biddu being used as a shield to deter stone-throwing protesters. Rabbi Arik Ascherman was placed under arrest after he tried to intervene.

In 2005, Israel's High Court of Justice banned the practice, with the Israeli Defense Ministry appealing the decision. While acknowledging and defending the "use of Palestinians to deliver warnings to wanted men about impending arrest operations", a practice known in Israel by the euphemism "neighbor procedure", the IDF denied reports of "using Palestinians as human shields against attacks on IDF forces", saying it had already forbidden this practice.

In 2006, however, initial investigations by B'Tselem indicated that the IDF might have used civilians as human shields in 2006 Beit Hanun.

In February 2007, the footage was released of an incident involving Sameh Amira, a 24-year-old Palestinian, whom video showed serving as a human shield for a group of Israeli soldiers, getting inside apartments suspected to belong to Palestinian militants ahead of the soldiers. A 15-year-old cousin of Amira and an 11-year-old girl in the West Bank independently told B'Tselem in February 2007 that Israeli soldiers forced each of them in separate incidents to open the door of a neighboring apartment belonging to a suspected militant, get inside ahead of them, and open doors and windows.

The Israeli Army launched a criminal investigation into the incident involving Amira. In April 2007, the Israeli army suspended a commander after the unit he was leading was accused of using Palestinians as human shields in a West Bank operation. In April 2007, CBS News reported that, according to human rights groups, the IDF did not stop the use of human shields, but the incidence was dropping.

During the 2008–2009 Gaza War

During the 2008–09 Gaza War known as Operation Cast Lead, Israeli military forces were accused of continuing to use civilians as human shields by Amnesty International and Breaking the Silence. According to testimonies published by these two groups, Israeli forces used unarmed Palestinians including children to protect military positions, walk in front of armed soldiers; go into buildings to check for booby traps or gunmen; and inspect suspicious objects for explosives. Amnesty International stated that it found cases in which "Israeli troops forced Palestinians to stay in one room of their home while turning the rest of the house into a base and sniper position, effectively using the families, both adults and children, as human shields and putting them at risk". The UN Human Rights Council also accused Israel of using human shields during the 2008–09 Gaza conflict.

The Guardian compiled three videos and testimony from civilians about alleged war crimes committed by Israeli soldiers during the 2008–09 Gaza War, including the use of Palestinian children as human shields. In the videos, three teenage brothers from the al-Attar family said that they were forced at gunpoint to kneel in front of tanks to deter Hamas fighters from firing at them and that they were used to "clear" houses for the Israeli soldiers.

An IDF soldier's testimony for Breaking the Silence told that his commander ordered that for every house raided by the IDF, they send a "neighbor" to go in before the soldier, sometimes while the soldier placed his gun on the neighbor's shoulder; according to the soldier, "commanders said these were the instructions and we had to do it". Gazan civilians also testified of being used at gunpoint as human shields by Israeli soldiers.
An Israeli military official responded to these allegations: "The IDF operated in accordance with the rules of war and did the utmost to minimize harm to civilians uninvolved in combat. The IDF's use of weapons conforms to international law." An Israeli embassy spokesperson alleged Hamas pressured the people of Gaza into making those accusations.

On March 12, 2010, the Israel Defense Forces prosecution filed indictments against two staff sergeants of the Givati Brigade for forcing a 9-year-old Palestinian boy to open a number of bags they thought might contain explosives in January 2009. The boy told he was hit by the soldiers and forced to work for them at gunpoint. The IDF said it opened the investigation after the incident was brought to its attention by the United Nations. On October 3, 2010, a conviction in this matter, accompanied by a demotion and suspended sentence, was handed down by the military court against both defendants, though neither soldier was jailed. The sentence was criticized as too lenient by Human Rights Watch and the boy's mother.

From 2009 to the 2014 Gaza War

A United Nations human rights body accused Israeli forces in June 2013 of "continuous use of Palestinian children as human shields and informants", voicing with deep concern 14 such cases had been reported between January 2010 and March 2013. It says almost all accused soldiers involved in the incidents have gone unpunished.

In an interview with Breaking the Silence, a former Israeli soldier recounted that the commander of his unit employed the policy, that of forcing Palestinian civilians to enter the homes of suspected militants ahead of Israeli soldiers, despite acknowledging its ban, as the commander would rather that a Palestinian civilian be killed carrying out the duty than one of his men. He told young Palestinian boys were also used by this particular unit to carry out military duties for the Israeli army.

Defense for Children International-Palestine reported 17-year-old, Ahmad Abu Raida (also: "Reeda"), was kidnapped by Israeli soldiers, who, after beating him up and threatening him, at times with sexual overtones, used him as a human shield for five days, forcing him to walk in front of them with police dogs at gunpoint, search houses and dig in places soldiers suspected there might be tunnels. The New York Times stated that his assertions could not be independently corroborated; the Israeli military confirmed that he had been detained, noting his father's affiliation with Hamas, who was a senior official in the Gaza Tourism Ministry. No material evidence of the physical violence allegedly suffered by Raida, e.g. photos, medical reports or lingering wounds resulting from repeated blows, was produced.

The Euro-Mediterranean Human Rights Monitor conducted an investigation during and following the military operation. The investigation found that, during the 2014 Gaza War, Israeli soldiers used Palestinian civilians as shield in Khuza'a. A family told the group that Israeli soldiers had killed the family's patriarch, a 65-year-old who was carrying a white flag, and proceeded to place family members, including children, by the house's windows and shoot from behind them.

A UN official accused Israel of using a school in Gaza as a military base.

In May 2022, Israeli columnist Amira Hass wrote that Israel's Yamam police force invaded a family home in the Palestinian city of Jenin and used the father and his daughters as human shields during an operation.

Iraq War

During the 2003 Invasion of Iraq, a group of people chose to travel to Iraq to act as human shields. Their purpose was to prevent American-led coalition forces from bombing certain locations. Of about 200 to 500 human shields who traveled to Iraq before hostilities, at least eighty stayed.

U.S. Army Cavalry Scout Scott Ewing, who served in Iraq in the 2005–2006 period, stated that U.S. troops would give candy to Iraqi children so they would stay around their vehicles, thereby making more likely that enemies would not attack them.

Lebanon War
An Australian journalist claimed during the 2006 Lebanon War that Hezbollah used Lebanese civilians as human shields to dissuade the IDF from firing at gunmen and rocket launchers. Human Rights Watch conducted its own investigation and reported that Hezbollah did not "deliberately" use civilians as a deterrent from IDF attack. HRW did however conclude Hezbollah stored weapons "in or near civilian homes" and fighters launched rockets within populated areas and near UN observers. HRW also accused Hezbollah of using Lebanese homes as sites for rocket launchers, usually without the homeowner's knowledge or permission, putting large numbers of civilians at risk.

On July 25, 2006, Israeli forces attacked and destroyed a UN observer post in southern Lebanon, resulting in four deaths. One of the fatalities, Canadian Major Paeta Derek Hess-von Kruedener, had sent an e‑mail to his former commander, retired Major-General Lewis MacKenzie, several days before his death in which he described the Israeli bombardment, writing "The closest artillery has landed within two meters of our position and the closest 1,000 lb aerial bomb has landed 100 meters from our patrol base. This has not been deliberate targeting, but rather due to tactical necessity". MacKenzie interpreted this language for a reporter: "What that means is, in plain English, 'We've got Hezbollah fighters running around in our positions, taking our positions here and then using us for shields and then engaging the (Israeli Defence Forces). A senior UN official, replying about Major Hess-von Kruedener's e-mail concerning Hezbollah's presence in the area of the UN base, said "At the time, there had been no Hezbollah activity reported in the area. So it was quite clear they were not going after other targets; that, for whatever reason, our position was being fired upon." He went on to claim that the Israelis were told where the UN base was and that it was clearly marked but they bombed it anyway.

Siege of Lal Masjid
According to the Pakistan Army spokesman, Islamic militants used girls as human shields in Pakistan during the 2007 Siege of Lal Masjid. The mosque's head cleric denied the allegations.

On December 4, 2009, terrorists attacked a Friday prayer ceremony in a mosque in Rawalpindi, Pakistan, where Bilal Riaz, a graduate student, acted as a human shield to save his nephew's life.

Sri Lankan Civil War 

According to a Human Rights Watch report published on February 19, 2009, the LTTE had been preventing Tamil people civilians from fleeing out of rebel held area and using them as human shields against the Sri Lankan Army offensive. The report outlines that according to the NGO's own findings, the human rights violations "include deliberate, indiscriminate, and disproportionate attacks on civilians, hostage taking, and use of human shields". This is concluded in the report's own recommendations to the LTTE, stating that the use of human shields as well as the placing of military targets near civilian populations being a war crime as per the International Humanitarian Law found in IHL. Sri Lankan government's Maxwell Paranagama Commission stated that the LTTE was principally responsible for the loss of civilian life during the final phase of the armed conflict through their action to use fleeing Tamil civilians as Human Shields clearly differing with the Darusman Report.

Libyan Civil Wars

During the First Libyan Civil War, Gaddafi loyalists were acting as human shields in the Libya no-fly zone, to try to protect Gaddafi's compound and airports.

In March 2016, during the Second Libyan Civil War, it was reported that two Italians who had been kidnapped in June 2015 were killed while they were used as human shields by Islamic State gunmen in Sorman.

Syrian Civil War

During the Syrian Civil War, the Syrian Armed Forces and loyalists were accused by Human Rights Watch of using residents of towns as human shields when advancing on opposition held areas, forcing them to march in front of the army.  Witness from different towns across the country said that the army had kidnapped people and forced them to march in front of them when attacking towns and villages. The purpose of this was to protect the army from attack. HRW said "The Syrian army should immediately stop this abhorrent practice." Witnesses stated that the army forcibly used children and elderly people as well to deter anyone from firing on the soldiers.

ISIS in Syria
ISIS has ideologically justified use of Muslims as human shields.

The Islamic State (ISIL) militants, Saudi-supported the Syrian branch of al-Qaeda, and Jaysh al-Islam anti-Assad rebels were accused of using civilian residents of towns, Alawite civilians and captured Syrian soldiers as human shields.

On the use of human shields by ISIS in Syria, most notably was in 2019 as reported by SDF: The jihadists were using the civilians as human shields to block. The civilians were "on the front lines".

ISIS in Iraq
Among publicized examples of Islamic State ISIS militants using human shields in Iraq: In 2016, Islamic State militants rounded up thousands of villagers at gunpoint to use as human shields. And in April 2017 in Mosul.

Russian invasion of Ukraine 

During the 2022 Russian invasion of Ukraine, Russian soldiers held over 300 Ukrainian civilians as human shields in the basement of the school of Yahidne, where a Russian military camp was located; dozens of civilians died in the process. BBC found "clear evidence" of Russian troops using Ukrainian civilians as human shields in Obukhovychi, near the Belarusian border, where 150 people were held at the local school. Local residents reported that Russian forces leaving the village of Novyi Bykiv used Ukrainian children as human shields.

Jammu and Kashmir 

On April 9, 2017, during the Srinagar Lok Sabha by-election, a 26-year-old man captured by the Indian Army was tied to the front of a Jeep belonging to Indian Army as a column of Indian troops was moving through a locality. The man was reportedly tied to the vehicle to dissuade other Kashmiri insurgents from hurling stones at the Indian troops. The man was accused of being involved in throwing stones at Indian troops. The Government of India stated that it would stand by the officer who took the decision to use the insurgent as a human shield. J&K Human Rights Commission asked the Government of Jammu and Kashmir to pay 10 Lakh Rupees as compensation to the man used as human shield. Jammu and Kashmir government refused to pay.

Voluntary human shields

Anti-war activists
In recent years civilians have volunteered to serve as “human shields” to prevent military conflict. In January 2003, anti-war activists organised Human Shield Action to Iraq in advance of the March 2003 invasion. Ultimately, Human Shield Action brought 200 people to Iraq. Many of them left as they ran out of money and the likelihood of war became greater. Several of these human shields had to be rescued by U.S. Marines after Iraqis threatened them for opposing the invasion of their country.

Pro-Palestinian activists
Rabbis for Human Rights agreed to act as “human shields” during the annual olive harvest to protect Palestinian villages from settlers. Rachel Corrie and Tom Hurndall, Western International Solidarity Movement (ISM) volunteers in the Palestinian territories, who died in 2003 and 2004 respectively have been described as “human shields” campaigning against house demolition. ISM, however, strongly takes offence at the use of the term human shield to describe their work, preferring it be used only to refer to when armed combatants uses civilians as shields. Not even Amnesty International defines volunteer activist's actions or activist's actions for non-military property as “human shields”, and regards only the direction of "specific civilians to remain in their homes as “human shields” for fighters, munitions, or military equipment" as “human shields”. According to the 3 definitions in the header of this article the 'volunteers to protect Palestinians' make them not “human shields outside the battlefield” but protesters or ordinary pro-Palestinian demonstrants.

See also

References 

Law of war
Activism by type
Human rights abuses
War crimes by type
Terrorism tactics